Clear Lake is the name of several lakes in Canada:

Alberta
Clear Lake (County of Barrhead No. 11, Alberta) 
Clear Lake (Starland County, Alberta) 
Clear Lake (Municipal District of Wainwright No. 61, Alberta) 
Clear Lake (Municipal District of Willow Creek No. 26, Alberta) 
Clear Lake (Wood Buffalo Regional Municipality, Alberta)

British Columbia
Clear Lake (Cariboo Regional District, British Columbia) 
Clear Lake (Fraser-Fort George, Regional District, British Columbia)
Clear Lake (Kootenay Boundary Regional District, British Columbia) 
Clear Lake (Quadra Island)

Ontario
Clear Lake (Huron Shores, Ontario) (Algoma District) 
Clear Lake (Spanish, Ontario) (Algoma District)
Clear Lake (Bruce County, Ontario) 
Clear Lake (Nansen Township, Ontario) (Cochrane District) 
Clear Lake (Nettleton Township, Ontario) (Cochrane District)
Clear Lake (O'Brien Township, Ontario) (Cochrane District) 
Clear Lake (Ritchie Township, Ontario) (Cochrane District) 
Clear Lake (Timmins, Ontario) (Cochrane District) 
Clear Lake (Frontenac County, Ontario) 
Clear Lake (Greater Sudbury, Ontario) 
Clear Lake (Algonquin Highlands, Ontario) (Haliburton County) 
Clear Lake (Minden Hills, Ontario) (Haliburton County)
Clear Lake (Kawartha Lakes, Ontario) 
Clear Lake (Axe River) (Kenora District) 
Clear Lake (Bray) (Kenora District)
Clear Lake (Kirkup Township, Ontario) (Kenora District)
Clear Lake (McKellar Lake) (Kenora District) 
Clear Lake (Oslo Lake) (Kenora District) 
Clear Lake (Lanark Highlands, Ontario) (Lanark County) 
Clear Lake (Tay Valley, Ontario) (Lanark County)
Clear Lake (United Counties of Leeds and Grenville, Ontario) 
Clear Lake (Bracebridge, Ontario) (Muskoka)
Clear Lake (Muskoka Lakes, Ontario) (Muskoka) 
Clear Lake (Nipissing District, Ontario) 
Clear Lake (Burton Township, Ontario) (Parry Sound District)
Clear Lake (East Mills Township, Ontario) (Parry Sound District)
Clear Lake (Foley Township, Ontario) (Parry Sound District)
Clear Lake (Humphrey Township, Ontario) (Parry Sound District)   
Clear Lake (McKellar, Ontario) (Parry Sound District) 
Clear Lake (Mowat Township, Ontario) (Parry Sound District) 
Clear Lake (Patterson Township, Ontario) (Parry Sound District) 
Clear Lake (Perry, Ontario) (Parry Sound District) 
Clear Lake (The Archipelago, Ontario) (Parry Sound District) 
Clear Lake (Whitestone, Ontario) (Parry Sound District) 
Clear Lake (Wilson Township, Ontario) (Parry Sound District) 
Clear Lake (Peterorough County, Ontario)  
Clear Lake (Laurentian Hills, Ontario) (Renfrew County) 
Clear Lake (Laurentian Valley, Ontario) (Renfrew County) 
Clear Lake (Espanola, Ontario) (Sudbury District)
Clear Lake (Hess Township, Ontario) (Sudbury District)
Clear Lake (Bayly Township, Ontario) (Timiskaming District) 
Clear Lake (Coleman, Ontario) (Timiskaming District)

Manitoba
Clear Lake (Riding Mountain National Park, Manitoba)
Clear Lake (Rural Municipality of Grahamdale, Manitoba)

New Brunswick
Clear Lake (Charlotte County, New Brunswick)
Clear Lake (Saint John County, New Brunswick) 
Clear Lake (Mud Brook) (York County)
Clear Lake (Stormy Brook) (York County)

Other provinces
Clear Lake (Saskatchewan) 
Clear Lake (Nova Scotia)

References
Place names - Geographical names search, Natural Resources Canada